Bandora is a census town in Ponda Taluka in North Goa district  in the state of Goa, India.

Geography

It has an average elevation of 107 metres (351 feet).

Demographics
 India census, Bandora had a population of 12,264. Males constitute 54% of the population and females 46%. Bandora has an average literacy rate of 71%, higher than the national average of 59.5%; with 59% of the males and 41% of females literate. 10% of the population is under 6 years of age.

Archaeology 
An ancient Jain temple of Tirthankara Neminatha was found in Bandora, Goa from 1425 AD; it is now an archaeological site.

References

Cities and towns in North Goa district